Utrillo may refer to:

 Maurice Utrillo (1883–1955), French painter of the School of Paris
 Miquel Utrillo (1862–1934), Catalan art critic, scenographer, painter and engineer

See also
 Utrilla